Diplochaetus rutilus is a species of ground beetle in the family Carabidae. It is found in the Caribbean Sea, and Central, North, and South America.

References

Further reading

 

Trechinae
Articles created by Qbugbot
Beetles described in 1863